Aya Ben Abdallah (born 19 August 1997) is a Tunisian handball player for Club Africain and the Tunisian national team.

She participated at the 2017 World Women's Handball Championship.

References

1997 births
Living people
Tunisian female handball players
Mediterranean Games competitors for Tunisia
Competitors at the 2022 Mediterranean Games